Euprosthenopsis is a genus of African nursery web spiders that was first described by P. Blandin in 1974.

Species
 it contains seven species and one subspecies, found only in Africa:
Euprosthenopsis armata (Strand, 1913) (type) – Central, East Africa
Euprosthenopsis lamorali Blandin, 1977 – South Africa
Euprosthenopsis lesserti (Roewer, 1955) – East Africa
Euprosthenopsis l. garambensis (Lessert, 1928) – Central Africa
Euprosthenopsis pulchella (Pocock, 1902) – South Africa, Lesotho, Eswatini
Euprosthenopsis rothschildi Blandin, 1977 – Kenya
Euprosthenopsis vachoni Blandin, 1977 – Djibouti
Euprosthenopsis vuattouxi Blandin, 1977 – Ivory Coast

See also
 List of Pisauridae species

References

Araneomorphae genera
Pisauridae
Spiders of Africa